John Light Napier (born May 16, 1947) is an American politician, lawyer, former member of the United States House of Representatives, and judge from South Carolina.

Education
John Light Napier attended public schools in Marlboro County, South Carolina, before college.  He graduated from Davidson College in 1969 and earned a J.D. from the University of South Carolina in 1972, while serving as a first lieutenant in the United States Army Reserve (which he served in until 1977).

Early career
Napier was admitted to the bar in 1972, and also began to serve as legislative assistant to United States Senator Strom Thurmond, while serving as minority counsel on both the Subcommittee on Administrative Practices and Procedures and the Committee on Veterans Affairs.  In 1976, he was made Senator Thurmond's chief legal assistant and legal counsel.  In 1977, he was named Chief Republican Counsel to the Senate Special Committee on Official Conduct which was charged with writing  the initial Code of Ethics and Financial Disclosure for the US Senate.  In 1978, Napier returned to the private practice of law in Bennettsville, South Carolina, which he maintained until 1980.

House of Representatives
In 1980, Napier was elected to the 97th United States Congress as a Representative from South Carolina's 6th congressional district.  He served in this capacity until 1983, having lost his bid for reelection in 1982 to Democrat Robin Tallon. He was named a Deputy Whip and served on the Agriculture and Veterans Affairs Committees. Working in tandem with his Congressional neighbor, Congressman Charlie Rose (Democrat, North Carolina), he was widely credited with coalition building and crafting the bipartisan legislation for the tobacco stabilization program vital to the agricultural community of the southeast.

U.S. Court of Federal Claims 
Napier was nominated by President Reagan to the United States Court of Federal Claims in 1986. He was unanimously confirmed by the Senate. In this assignment he sat on a 16 member national trial court hearing government contracts, patents. takings, tax refunds, Indian claims, congressional references, and other complex litigation involving actions against the federal government.  At the request of the Chief Judge and his colleagues, he chaired a special committee of the judges which led to a restructuring  the Clerk's office and the Financial office at the Court. He resigned his commission to join a Washington law firm.

Later career
Following his defeat in the 1982 election, Napier returned to the private practice of law in Bennettsville, until 1986, when President Ronald Reagan appointed him as judge in the United States Claims Court. He resigned from the court in 1989 and returned to private practice. In 1992 he served as special outside counsel in the House Committee on House Administration’s investigation of the Congressional Post Office scandal. 

In private practice, he served as special outside counsel to the House of Representatives' committee investigating the US House Post Office scandal. His later career has involved a national law and governmental relations practice in Washington and the Carolinas which has included representation of national associations, state and local government entities, private industry, as well as individuals in a wide variety of governmental issues.

External links

 John Light Napier personal website.

1947 births
Living people
People from Marlboro County, South Carolina
University of South Carolina alumni
Judges of the United States Court of Federal Claims
United States Article I federal judges appointed by Ronald Reagan
20th-century American judges
Davidson College alumni
Republican Party members of the United States House of Representatives from South Carolina
20th-century American politicians
Members of Congress who became lobbyists